Deep in the Night is the thirteenth studio album by Etta James, released in 1978.

Track listing

Personnel
Ed Thrasher – artwork by (art direction)
Alexander Hamilton, Gilbert Ivey, Henry Jackson, Joyce Austin, Merry Clayton, Reuben Franklin – backing vocals
Chuck Rainey – bass guitar
Jeff Porcaro – drums
Keith Johnson – electric piano
Bruce Robb, Joe Chiccarelli – engineer
Cornell Dupree – guitar (lead)
Larry Carlton – guitar (rhythm)
Brian Ray – guitar (slide)
Bruce Robb, Dee Robb – mixed by
Richard Tee – organ, piano
Tom Roady – percussion
Jim McCrary – photography
Jim Horn, Plas Johnson – saxophone

References

1978 albums
Etta James albums
Albums produced by Jerry Wexler
Warner Records albums